Meike Bartels (born 1973) is a Dutch psychologist and behavior geneticist known for her research on the genetics of happiness and subjective well-being. She is professor in "Behavior and Quantitative Genetics" at the Department of Biological Psychology at VU University Amsterdam and affiliated with the Amsterdam Public Health Institute. She also holds a University Research Chair in Genetics and Wellbeing at the Vrije Universiteit Amsterdam. In 2008, she received the Fuller & Scott Award from the Behavior Genetics Association. She is one of the principal investigators on the study finding genetic variants related to well-being

References

External links
Faculty profile

Living people
1973 births
Dutch psychologists
Dutch women psychologists
Behavior geneticists
Women geneticists
Academic staff of Vrije Universiteit Amsterdam
Vrije Universiteit Amsterdam alumni
Virginia Commonwealth University alumni